Ranavalona II (1829 – 13 July 1883) was Queen regnant of Madagascar from 1868 to 1883, succeeding Queen Rasoherina, her first cousin. She is best remembered for Christianizing the royal court during her reign.

Early life 

Ranavalona II was born Princess Ramoma in 1829 at Ambatomanoina, near Antananarivo in the central highlands to Prince Razakaratrimo and his wife Princess Rafarasoa Ramasindrazana. As a young woman she, like her cousin Rasoherina, was married to King Radama II and was widowed upon his assassination in the nobles' coup of 1863. The prime minister at the time, Rainivoninahitriniony, played a major role in the assassination plot and public condemnation of the action forced him from his post.  The position of prime minister was then filled by his younger brother Rainilaiarivony, who married Queen Rasoherina and then, upon her death, helped to designate Ranavalona II the next monarch of Madagascar and consequently married her to retain his position.

During her years at court, young Ramoma was tutored by Protestant missionaries who greatly influenced her religious and political views.  She became increasingly favorable toward the beliefs of the Christian religion.

Reign 

Ranavalona II succeeded to the throne upon the death of Queen Rasoherina on 1 April 1868. On 21 February 1869, she entered into a political marriage with her prime minister, Rainilaiarivony, in a public ceremony at Andohalo wherein the court officially underwent conversion to Christianity. This conversion was effected to bring the increasingly powerful Protestant faction under the influence of the royal court.  Declaring Madagascar a Christian nation, Ranavalona had the traditional royal talismans (sampy) burned in a bonfire in September 1869 and replaced their authority with that of the Bible.

Under her rule the problem of deforestation was considered. The queen authorized construction using brick and other durable materials within the walls of Antananarivo (previously forbidden by King Andrianampoinimerina). She also banned the traditional practice of tavy (swidden, slash-and-burn agriculture), charcoal making and construction of houses within forests.

A European visitor to the court of Ranavalona II in 1873 described the queen in the following terms: "I should think the queen was about 45 years of age, with a dark olive complexion, and a face full of kindness and benevolence.  She was very queenly, and dressed in a gray shot-silk dress, and a silk lamba fell negligently from her shoulders. Her hair was black, and beautifully arranged; 'crown she did not wear', but from the hair at the top of her head there depended the long fine gold chain ending in a gold tassel, which only the queen can wear."

Death and succession 

Ranavalona II died in 1883 and was buried in Ambohimanga. In a bid to desacralize the holy city, in 1897 the French colonial authority disinterred her remains along with those of other monarchs buried in Ambohimanga and transferred them to the tombs on the compound of the Rova of Antananarivo, where her bones were interred in the tomb of Queen Rasoherina. She was succeeded by Queen Ranavalona III, the last monarch of the kingdom.

References 

1829 births
1883 deaths
Converts to Protestantism from pagan religions
Protestant monarchs
Queens regnant of Madagascar
Remarried royal consorts
Malagasy Protestants
Malagasy people of the Madagascar expeditions
19th-century women rulers
19th-century monarchs in Africa